The Ministry of Health and Medical Education (MOHME) has executive responsibility for health and medical education within the Iranian government. The MOHME comprises five departments headed by deputy ministers:
Research and Technology
Education 
Logistics
Food and Drugs
Health

Iran's health system is highly centralized, and almost all decisions regarding general goals, policies and allocation of resources are made at the central level by MOHME. The Ministry has the legal authority to oversee, license and regulate the activities of the private health sector.

An elaborate system of health network provides Primary Health Care (PHC) to the vast majority of the Iranian public. MOHME owns and runs Iran's largest health care delivery network of health establishments and medical schools. MOHME is in charge of provision of healthcare services through its network, medical insurance, medical education, supervision and regulation of the healthcare system in the country, policymaking, production and distribution of pharmaceuticals, and research and development.

The Third Socio-economic Development Plan in 1999 authorized MOHME to adopt move towards public–private partnership in health care delivery. According to the 2003 Statistical Centre of Iran census, Iran has 730 medical establishments (hospitals, clinics,...) with 110,797 beds in all, of which 488 (77,300 beds) are run by the MOHME, 120 (11,301 beds) are privately owned, and the rest belong to other organisations, such as the Social Security Organization of Iran (SSO). According to the World Health Organization, private hospitals also do not prefer to contract with the Ministry of Health and Medical Education, because of low tariffs, extra paperwork and delays in payment.

Since the 1979 revolution, Iran has adopted a full generic-based National Drug Policy (NDP), with local production of essential drugs and vaccines as one of the main goals. MOHME has a mission to provide access to sufficient quantities of safe, effective and high quality medicines that are affordable for the entire population.

MOHME is the main stakeholder of pharmaceutical affairs in the country. However, the Social Security Investment Co. (SSIC), Iran's largest holding company, which owns and controls 22 pharmaceutical manufacturing companies with a 40% share of total pharmaceutical production in Iran, is affiliated to the Ministry of Welfare.

In 2006, 55 pharmaceutical companies in Iran produce more than 96 percent (quantitatively) of medicines on the market, worth $1.2 billion annually in a total market worth $1.87 billion (2008) and $3.65bn by 2013 (projected). Although over 85 percent of the population use an insurance system to reimburse their drug expenses, the government heavily subsidises pharmaceutical production/importation.

The MOHME Department of Medical Equipment supervises imports of medical equipment, its import and distribution is mostly handled by the private sector.

Ministers since 1979

See also

 Health care in Iran
 Science and technology in Iran 
 Agriculture in Iran

References

External links
 

Health
Iran
Medical and health organisations based in Iran
Higher education in Iran